Critical Situation (also known as Situation Critical in the UK) is an American documentary television series. Produced in conjunction with the National Geographic Channel, the series examined various disasters or violent incidents.  The main tagline of the show reads, "This is Situation Critical," or some variation thereof. As of November 2007, 13 episodes have been aired.

Episodes

See also
Blueprint for Disaster
Seconds From Disaster
Seismic Seconds
Mayday: Air Crash Investigation
Trapped
Zero Hour
Final Report

External links
 (link inactive)

2000s American documentary television series
National Geographic (American TV channel) original programming
2007 American television series debuts
2008 American television series endings
Documentary films about disasters